Sherlock Holmes is a German 1967 television series featuring Erich Schellow as Sherlock Holmes and Paul Edwin Roth as Dr. Watson.

The series aired on WDR from 28 August 1967 to 13 February 1968 and is formed by six episodes, each one adapting a Sherlock Holmes short story written by Arthur Conan Doyle, though the scripts are based on the adaptations made in the first season of the British TV series Sherlock Holmes (1965–1968). A DVD was issued in 2012 as number 45 in the Straßenfeger compilation series of crime-related film and TV productions, along with Conan Doyle und der Fall Edalji (1966) and Sherlock Holmes und das Halsband des Todes (1962), all with German language soundtracks only, and no subtitles.

Episodes

References

External links

Sherlock Holmes television series
1967 German television series debuts
1968 German television series endings
German-language television shows
Das Erste original programming